Sophie Pedder is a British journalist and author, who is Paris bureau chief for The Economist newspaper and a specialist on France. She is a biographer of French President Emmanuel Macron.

Born in London, she obtained a first-class degree at the University of Oxford (St John's College) and a MA at the University of Chicago, where she was a post-graduate Fulbright scholar. Before working for The Economist, Pedder was a research assistant for Professor William Julius Wilson at the University of Chicago’s Urban Poverty and Family Life project. She entered The Economist in 1990. Following a spell as correspondent in South Africa from 1994 to 1997, when she covered the end of apartheid, Pedder returned to write about European politics from London and became the Paris bureau chief in 2003. She has also collaborated as political commentator for BBC and CNN, and has written for Prospect, Foreign Affairs, Le Monde, Paris-Match and Le Figaro, among other media outlets.

It was in Pedder's interview with Emmanuel Macron for The Economist on 7 November 2019 that he declared the "brain death" of NATO, a phrase that stirred global political controversy.

Her biography of the French president, "Revolution Française: Emmanuel Macron and the quest to reinvent a nation", was described by the Wall Street Journal as "a terrific first draft of a history with significance far beyond the borders of France."

Awards 
  (2006)

Works

References 
Informational notes

Citations

Bibliography
 Delves Broughton, Philip (12 August 2018). "‘Revolution Française’ Review: The March of Macron", Wall Street Journal
 Sheridan, Michael (17 June 2018). "Review: Revolution Française: Emmanuel Macron and the Quest to Reinvent a Nation by Sophie Pedder", The Sunday Times 
  Kuper, Simon (27 June 2018). "How Emmanuel Macron charmed a nation", New Statesman
 Gernelle, Etienne (21 June 2018). "Macron et la piqûre du regret. D'étonnantes confidences présidentielles dans le livre de Sophie Pedder font resurgir la question centrale : Macron va-t-il assez vite et assez loin ?", Le Point
 Marlowe, Lara (5 June 2018). "Paris Letter: Macron and the strange quality of optimism: Sophie Pedder’s new book profiles France’s president as an isolated, gutsy character", Irish Times     
 
 
 
 

Living people
1950 births
British journalists
Alumni of the University of Oxford
The Economist people